Waitz is a surname. Notable people with the surname include:

Hans Waitz, German Biblical scholar
Georg Waitz, German historian and politician
Grete Waitz, Norwegian long distance runner
Theodor Waitz, German psychologist and anthropologist

See also
Weitz
Weiz, a town and district in Austria